Rowland White (born 18 June 1970) is a British best-selling author  He writes about aviation.

Life and education

White grew up in Cambridge, and began learning and writing about aviation as a child, before studying Modern History at the University of Liverpool. He graduated in 1992. He now lives in a village near Cambridge with his wife and three children.

Career
White's first book, Vulcan 607 (about the first Operation Black Buck raid in the Falklands Conflict 1982), was published by Bantam Press in 2006. It was followed in 2009 by Phoenix Squadron and, in 2010 Storm Front, about the Dhofar War in Oman in the early seventies. All three were "The Sunday Times" top-ten bestsellers. These were followed by The Big Book of Flight, published by Bantam Press in 2013 and Into the Black (2016) about the first flight of the space shuttle in 1981.

White's writing has appeared in British national newspapers including "The Guardian", "The Daily Mail" and "The Sun", "Esquire" magazine, and in aviation magazines including "Aeroplane Monthly", "Fly Past" and "Aircraft Illustrated". A documentary based on the book Vulcan 607 called "The Falklands’ Most Daring Raid" was made by Darlow Smithson, and was first aired on Channel 4 in March 2012.

White has also worked as the publishing director at Michael Josephs Publishing. He has published works by Tom Clancy, Clive Cussler, Andy McNab, Jeremy Clarkson, Ellen MacArthur, Roy Keane, Viv Richards and Brian Johnson, the lead singer from AC/DC. The titles he has published include: Tornado Down by John Nichol and John Peters, Sniper One, Sabre Squadron, Joint Force Harrier and Immediate Response, Major Mark Hammond’s account of his time flying Chinooks in Afghanistan.

Works
 Vulcan 607 (Bantam Press, 2006) 
 Phoenix Squadron (Bantam Press, 2009) 
 Storm Front (Bantam Press, 2010) 
 The Big Book of Flight (Bantam Press, 2013) 
 Into the Black (Bantam Press, 2016) 
 Harrier 809 (Bantam Press, 2020)

References

External links
1.  http://www.rowlandwhite.com/

British writers
1970 births
Living people